Cliff Danquah Akurang (born 27 February 1981) is a former professional footballer who played in the Football League for Barnet.

Early life
Akurang was born in Accra.

Career
After prolific spells at Heybridge Swifts and Thurrock, he joined Dagenham & Redbridge and then Histon. He found his form during at Bridge Road, scoring several goals in the first half of the 2007–08 season including a hat-trick against Torquay United. His performances attracted the attention of Barnet, who signed him in January 2008. However, he struggled for form at Underhill and, in March 2009, he joined Weymouth on loan. In the summer of 2009, he joined Rushden & Diamonds on a season long loan. Akurang was released by Barnet at the end of the 2009–10 season and rejoined Thurrock on a one-year contract, leaving on 1 November 2010. He moved on to Maidenhead in November 2010 and Braintree Town on his thirtieth birthday, 27 February 2011. On 12 September 2015, it was announced that Akurang had joined Billericay Town but moved to local rivals Canvey Island in February 2016. Akurang finished the 2017–18 Essex & Suffolk Border League season with Coggeshall United, scoring four goals in 12 league appearances.

Managerial career

In December 2014, Akurang was appointed manager of Heybridge Swifts, following the departure of previous manager Keith Hill. He left Heybridge Swifts being sacked on 8 September 2015. In the summer of 2017, Akurang became player-manager of newly founded Coggeshall United. Later in the season he also became chairman. He was appointed manager of Coggeshall Town in May 2022, but left the club in October the same year.

Honours
Dagenham & Redbridge
Conference National: 2006–07

References

External links

Barnet profile

1981 births
Living people
Footballers from Accra
Ghanaian footballers
English footballers
Association football forwards
Chelsea F.C. players
Luton Town F.C. players
Chesham United F.C. players
Hitchin Town F.C. players
Thurrock F.C. players
Heybridge Swifts F.C. players
Dagenham & Redbridge F.C. players
Histon F.C. players
Barnet F.C. players
Weymouth F.C. players
Rushden & Diamonds F.C. players
Maidenhead United F.C. players
Braintree Town F.C. players
Chelmsford City F.C. players
Bishop's Stortford F.C. players
Boreham Wood F.C. players
Canvey Island F.C. players
Leiston F.C. players
Hayes & Yeading United F.C. players
Maldon & Tiptree F.C. players
Billericay Town F.C. players
English Football League players
National League (English football) players
Isthmian League players
Southern Football League players
English football managers
Heybridge Swifts F.C. managers
English football chairmen and investors
Coggeshall Town F.C. players
Coggeshall Town F.C. managers